WPM may refer to:

Organizations
 Windermere Property Management, another name for Windermere Real Estate
 World Patent Marketing, a fraudulent US invention promotion firm
 Wheaton Precious Metals, precious metal streaming companies

Other uses
 Words per minute, a measure of how many words a person or system can read or write in that amount of time
 Water point mapping, a tool for monitoring the distribution and status of water supplies
 Windows Package Manager